Giorgio Locatelli (born 6 April 1963) is an Italian Michelin starred chef and restaurateur working and living in the United Kingdom.

Early life 
Locatelli was brought up in Corgeno in the comune of Vergiate on the banks of Lake Comabbio, northern Italy. His uncle ran a restaurant, giving him an appreciation and understanding of food from an early age. After working for a short spell in local restaurants in Italy and Switzerland, Locatelli went to England in 1986 to join the kitchens of Anton Edelmann at The Savoy. In 1990, Locatelli moved to Paris and worked at Restaurant Laurent and La Tour d'Argent. Locatelli was in the army in his youth.

Career
On his return to London a couple of years later, Locatelli opened Olivo Restaurant, Eccleston Street, before opening Zafferano in February 1995.

They won "Best Italian Restaurant" at the London Carlton Restaurant Awards for two consecutive years and their first Michelin star in 1999.

In February 2002, Locatelli and his wife Plaxy opened their first independent restaurant, Locanda Locatelli, on Seymour Street. The restaurant, which serves traditional Italian dishes, was awarded a Michelin star in 2003, which has been retained every year since.

Locatelli has been featured in several TV series: Pure Italian, 2002, aired on the UK Food channel; Tony and Giorgio, filmed with entrepreneur Tony Allan, shown on BBC2; and Sicily Unpacked  Italy Unpacked with art historian Andrew Graham-Dixon.

The Big Family Cooking Showdown was also on the BBC with Locatelli as a judge with Rosemary Shrager. The hosts were Zoe Ball and Nadiya Hussain.

He has written three cookery books. Made in Italy, was published in September 2006. Made in Italy has received the Best Food Book award at the Glenfiddich Food and Drink Awards 2007. A second book, Made in Sicily, was published in September 2011. Made at Home was published by 4th Estate in 2017.

In January 2019, he became a judge of MasterChef Italia. In May of the same year he was guest in the Italian talk show EPCC (E poi c'è Cattelan) hosted by Alessandro Cattelan. There he announced he would be coming back as judge also for the ninth season of MasterChef Italia. He also revealed he feels more British than Italian, having spent so many years in London.

Personal life
Locatelli lives with his English wife Plaxy and their two children, Margherita and Jack, in Camden, London.

References

External links
 Homepage for the Locanda Locatelli restaurant
 
 Articles by Giorgio on his publisher's blog, 5th Estate
 Giorgio Locatelli, The Guardian

1963 births
Living people
Italian chefs
People from the Province of Varese
Italian expatriates in England
Italian television chefs